Amanda Marie Allen (born February 21, 2005) is a Canadian soccer player who plays for NDC Ontario in League1 Ontario.

Early life
Allen began playing soccer at age four with North Mississauga SC. She later played with Woodbridge Strikers, before joining the Canada Soccer NDC Ontario program. She also played for the Team Ontario provincial team. In 2022, she represented Ontario at the 2022 Canada Summer Games.

Club career
In 2022, she played with NDC Ontario in League1 Ontario. She was also named a league Third Team All-Star and U18 All-Star in 2022.

International career
She made her debut in the Canada Soccer program in December 2021, attending a camp with the Canada U17 team. She was subsequently selected to the roster for the 2022 CONCACAF Women's U-17 Championship, where she won a bronze medal, and the 2022 FIFA U-17 Women's World Cup. 

After her performance at the U17 World Cup, she was called up to the Canada senior team for the first time, at age 17, for friendlies against Brazil in November 2022. She made her senior debut on November 11, coming on as a substitute against Brazil.

References

External links

Living people
2005 births
Women's soccer players in Canada
Canadian women's soccer players
Canada women's international soccer players
Women's association football forwards
Soccer players from Mississauga
North Mississauga SC (women) players
Woodbridge Strikers (women) players